Seneo Perry is a New Zealand-based Botswana model and environmentalist. She is former Miss Earth Botswana 2020.

Background
Seneo Perry was born in Botswana in 1996. She grew up in Gaborone, Botswana. Perry comes from the central part of Botswana, She attained a degree in Entrepreneurial Business Leadership from Sheffield Hallam University (BAC). Perry started her modeling career in 2011 when she was in high school where she joined Miss Rainbow High School during her first year and won the title. In 2019 she then joined Miss Earth Botswana and made it to the top 5 winning Best Project category that year. She then won the Miss Earth Botswana crown the following year in 2020 and went on to represent Botswana at Miss Earth 2020. In 2021 she was nominated for Botswana Youth Awards. She then moved to New Zealand and in 2022 she started brand influencing for Oscar Wylee Eyewear and  Casetify through her agency Sharon Power. She is the founder of the #PeopleWildLifeEnvironmentMovement where she sensitise the importance of wildlife conservation as well as historical heritage sites around Botswana.

References

Botswana female models
1996 births
Living people